Some Living American Women Artists also referred to as Some Living American Women Artists/Last Supper is a collage by American artist Mary Beth Edelson created during the second wave feminist movement. The central portion is an image based on Leonardo da Vinci’s 15th-century mural Last Supper. Edelson replaced the faces of Christ's disciples with cut-out photographs of American women artists. She surrounded the central image with additional photographs of American women artists. The work is in the collection of the Museum of Modern Art.

Edelson intended the collage to "identify and commemorate women artists, who were getting little recognition at the time, by presenting them as the grand subject - while spoofing the patriarchy for cutting women out of positions of power and authority."

A lithograph edition of 50 prints was subsequently created. A numbered print is in the collection of the Smithsonian American Art Museum.

Artists included in the central portion

Lynda Benglis
Helen Frankenthaler
June Wayne
Alma Thomas
Lee Krasner
Nancy Graves
Georgia O'Keeffe (photograph replacing the image of Christ)
Elaine de Kooning
Louise Nevelson
M. C. Richards
Louise Bourgeois
Lila Katzen
Yoko Ono

Artists included in the surrounding border
Photographs of artists in the border are numbered, with a key at the bottom. There is an image numbered "3", but it is not included in the key. Number "43" is neither in the border nor in the key.

 Agnes Martin
 Joan Mitchell
 unidentified
 Grace Hartigan
 Yayoi Kusama
 Marisol
 Alice Neel
 Jane Wilson
 Judy Chicago
 Gladys Nilson [sic]
 Betty Parsons
 Miriam Shapiro [sic]
 Lee Bonticou [sic]
 Sylvia Stone
 Chryssa
 Sue Ellen Rocca [sic]
 Carolee Schneeman [sic]
 Lisette Model
 Audrey Flack
 Buffie Johnson
 Vera Simmons [sic]
 Helen Pashgian
 Susan Lewis Williams
 Racelle Strick
 Ann McCoy
  J. L. Knight
  Enid Sanford
 Joan Balou
 Marta Minujín
 Rosemary Wright
 Cynthia Bickley
 Lawra Gregory
 Agnes Denes
 Mary Beth Edelson
 Irene Siegel
 Nancy Grossman
 Hannah Wilke
 Jennifer Bartlett
 Mary Corse
 Eleanor Antin
 Jane Kaufman
 Muriel Castanis
 not in collage or key
 Susan Crile
 Anne Ryan
 Sue Ann Childress
 Patricia Mainardi
 Dindga McCannon
 Alice Shaddle
 Arden Scott
 Faith Rionggold [sic]
 Sharon Brant
 Daria Dorosh
 Nina Yankowitz
 Rachel bas-Cohain
 Loretta Dunkelman
 Kay Brown
 CeRoser
 Noma Copley
 Martha Edelheit
 Jackie Skyles 
 Barbara Zuker [sic]
 Susan Williams
 Judith Bernstein
 Rosemary Mayer
 Maud Boltz [sic]
 Patsy Norvell
 Joan Danziger
 Minna Citron

References

Further reading 
 Object of the Week: Some Living American Women Artists/Last Supper by Elisabeth Smith SAMBlog March 9, 2018
 Considering Mary Beth Edelson’s Some Living American Women Artists by Kat Griefen The Brooklyn Rail, March, 2019
 Some Living American Women Artists/Last Supper by Mary Beth Edelson Art From Us, June 13, 2020 

1972 in women's history
American art
American women artists
1972 in art